HOTO Business Tower is a modern business building in Zagreb, Croatia. It was built in 2004 as the first skyscraper after the Croatian War of Independence. It is located to the west of the Savska street, between the Cibona Tower and Zagrepčanka. It is about 64.5 m high and has 17 floors above ground and four levels underground. With a NLA of app. 15.400 m², and 250 parking lots in the underground garage, it is one of the biggest business towers in Zagreb.

The tower was housing the offices of T-Hrvatski Telekom, the Croatian branch of T-com, for about 10 years. 
The building was acquired by the SIGNA Property Funds in 2007.
Today it is the modern office building, available for lease of modern and representative A - class office spaces in the near proximity to the very center of Zagreb.

See also 
 List of tallest buildings in Croatia

Views of HOTO tower

External links 

HOTO at Emporis
HOTO Group

Office buildings completed in 2004
Buildings and structures in Zagreb
Skyscraper office buildings in Croatia